Patrick Weisner (born 17 March 1982) is a professional rugby league coach and a former professional rugby league footballer who played for Ireland at international level.

Background
Weisner was born in Sydney, New South Wales, Australia.

Playing career
A junior for the Canterbury-Bankstown Bulldogs, Weisner played in their 2000 Jersey Flegg Cup team alongside Braith Anasta and Roy Asotasi. He was a part of three consecutive Grand Final wins for The Bulldogs in 1999, 2000 and 2001 in Jersey Flegg Cup and NSW Cup competitions.

In England, Weisner played for the Leigh Centurions, Halifax, Harlequins RL, Barrow Raiders and Hull Kingston Rovers.

In 2005 he was named in The Championships dream team of the year as Loose Forward. In 2005 he was Halifax's youngest ever captain.

In 2010, the Manchester Evening News reported that Weisner left the Raiders, after he abandoned a club car at Manchester Airport, leaving Barrow with a £1,500 bill.

He also represented Ireland, kicking 3 drop goals on début vs Wales in a Man of the Match performance. He played in three matches at the 2004 European Nations Cup including the European Nations Cup Final vs England at Warrington.

Weisner later played for the Blacktown Workers, captaining their Ron Massey Cup side.

Coaching career
In 2015 Weisner was appointed as the Blacktown Workers's football director and co-coach of the Ron Massey Cup side. The club entered a team into the 2017 Intrust Super Premiership NSW in partnership with the Manly-Warringah Sea Eagles, and Weisner was appointed as coach.
In 2018 he was appointed Head Coach of the Asquith Magpies Ron Massey Cup team.

On 27 October 2018 he coached Niue in their 32–36 defeat to Italy staged in Sydney a week after guiding NIUE to the Emerging Nations World Cup Final.

In 2021 he was appointed Assistant Coach and Head of Recruitment at the North Sydney Bears NSW Cup team.

References

External links
Statistics at rugbyleagueproject.org
(archived by web.archive.org) Barrow Raiders profile
(archived by web.archive.org) Official Player Profile
(archived by web.archive.org) rleague.com stats

1982 births
Living people
Australian rugby league coaches
Australian rugby league players
Barrow Raiders players
Halifax R.L.F.C. players
Hull Kingston Rovers players
Ireland national rugby league team players
Leigh Leopards players
London Broncos players
Niue national rugby league team coaches
Rugby league five-eighths
Rugby league hookers